Jan Maliszak competed for Poland in the men's standing volleyball event at the 1996 Summer Paralympics, winning a bronze medal.

See also 
 Poland at the 1996 Summer Paralympics

References 

Living people
Year of birth missing (living people)
Place of birth missing (living people)
Polish men's volleyball players
Paralympic bronze medalists for Poland
Paralympic medalists in volleyball
Volleyball players at the 1996 Summer Paralympics
Medalists at the 1996 Summer Paralympics
Paralympic volleyball players of Poland